Pseudomonas aureofaciens is a yellowish, aerobic, Gram-negative, motile, polar-flagellated, rod-shaped bacterium isolated from clay near the River Maas. Based on 16S rRNA analysis, P. aureofaciens has been placed in the P. chlororaphis group.

References

Pseudomonadales
Bacteria described in 1956